Tropaeolum polyphyllum is a species of flowering plant in the nasturtium family Tropaeolaceae. It is endemic to mountainous regions of Chile and Argentina where it is called in Spanish soldadito grande de la cordillera (great soldier of the mountains).

Description
This herbaceous perennial overwinters as a tuber deep in the soil. It sends out long rhizomes from which shoots develop which trail over the ground. These are densely covered with silvery green, deeply lobed leaves. The flower buds have inflated pale green calyces and the sepals are extended backwards into a short spur. The relatively large and showy flowers are borne on long slender stalks and are golden yellow. After flowering, which takes place in mid-summer, the shoots die back and the plant remains dormant until the following year.

Distribution and habitat
Its typical habitat is among scantily vegetated stony ground or on scree where it forms small hummocks of grey-green foliage studded with yellow flowers. In this area, summer droughts may last for several months and what precipitation there is, falls mainly in the winter.

Cultivation
Tropaeolum polyphyllum needs full sun and neutral or slightly acid, well drained soil. It grows well on hot, dry banks and is hardy when fully established. Propagate from tubers or by seed. The containers should be kept at below  until the seedlings appear in about a month. Too high a temperature inhibits germination. The USDA Hardiness Zone is 7.

References

polyphyllum
Taxa named by Antonio José Cavanilles